Ilandža is a village in Serbia. It is situated in the Alibunar municipality, in the South Banat District, Vojvodina province. The village has a Serb ethnic majority and a population of 1,727 according to the 2002 census.

Name

In Serbian, the village is known as Ilandža (Иланџа), in Romanian as Ilangea, in Hungarian as Ilonc, in Croatian as Ilandža, and in German as Ilandscha or Ilantsch.

Historical population

Notable residents
Famous Serbian poet and writer Miloš Crnjanski lived here in his youth.

See also
List of places in Serbia
List of cities, towns and villages in Vojvodina

References

Slobodan Ćurčić, Broj stanovnika Vojvodine, Novi Sad, 1996.

External links

Official Website of Ilandža

Populated places in South Banat District
Populated places in Serbian Banat
Alibunar